Lescano is a surname. Notable people with the name include:

 Facundo Lescano (born 1996), Argentine football forward
 Juan Carlos Lescano (born 1991), Argentinian footballer
 Juan Eduardo Lescano (born 1992), Argentinian footballer
 Pablo Lescano (born 1977), Argentine singer, composer, keyboardist
 Yonhy Lescano (born 1959), Peruvian lawyer and politician

See also
 Lezcano